Arnold Luhaäär (20 October 1905 – 19 January 1965) was an Estonian heavyweight weightlifter. He competed in the 1928 Summer Olympics and 1936 Summer Olympics and won a silver and a bronze medal, respectively. He missed the 1932 games because Estonia could not afford sending a full team to Los Angeles during the Great Depression.

Luhaäär took up weightlifting in 1919 and won the national title in 1926, 1928, 1932–34 and 1936–38. In 1931 he also won the national Greco-Roman wrestling championships. Besides his Olympic medals he placed third at the 1938 World Championships and set a world record in the clean and jerk in 1937. After retiring from competitions he worked as a sports official and referee. In 1935–40 and 1945–52 he was a board member of the Estonian Weightlifting Federation, and in 1946–48 headed sport club Spartak Tallinn. Since 1992 an annual weightlifting tournament has been held in his hometown of Mõisaküla in his honor.

References

External links

 
 
 
 
  
 

1905 births
1965 deaths
People from Mulgi Parish
People from the Governorate of Livonia
Estonian male weightlifters
Olympic silver medalists for Estonia
Olympic bronze medalists for Estonia
Olympic weightlifters of Estonia
Weightlifters at the 1928 Summer Olympics
Weightlifters at the 1936 Summer Olympics
Olympic medalists in weightlifting
Medalists at the 1928 Summer Olympics
Medalists at the 1936 Summer Olympics
European Weightlifting Championships medalists
World Weightlifting Championships medalists
Soviet weightlifters